Balsaminapentaol or cucurbita-5,25-diene-3β,7β,23(R),24(R),29-pentaol,  is a chemical compound with formula , found in the Balsam apple vine (Momordica balsamina).  It is a cucurbitane-type triterpenoid, related to cucurbitacin, isolated by C. Ramalhete and others in 2009.

Balsaminepentaol is an amorphous powder soluble in methanol and ethyl acetate but insoluble in n-hexane. It is cytotoxic at about 50 μM.

See also 
 Balsaminol A
 Balsaminol B
 Cucurbalsaminol A
 Cucurbalsaminol B
 Karavilagenin E

References 

Triterpenes
Polyols